Matavera (traditionally known as Rangiatea) is the smallest of the five districts that make up the island of Rarotonga in the Cook Islands. It is located in the northeast of the island, to the east of the district of Avarua, and north of the district of Ngatangiia.

Matavera is subdivided into 5 tapere (out of 54 for Rarotonga), listed from west to east:
 Tupapa (Avarua District also has a Tapere named Tupapa)
 Titama
 Matavera
 Vaenga
 Pouara

References

 

Districts of the Cook Islands
Rarotonga